Vitangelo Spadavecchia (born 25 November 1982) is an Italian former professional footballer who played as a goalkeeper.

Club career

Bari
Spadavecchia joined Bari in mid-2000.

Spadavecchia joined Pescara on 25 August 2006.

Andria
In December 2009 Bari released Spadavecchia who played as a backup; he joined third tier club Andria in January 2010.

Match fixing scandal
On 11 October 2011 Spadavecchia was banned 3 years and 3 months for match fixing (until 1 January 2015). The suspected match was on 5 April 2009, Juve Stabia 1–0 Sorrento. His former teammate Cristian Biancone also banned, along with Roberto Amodio (sports director of Juve Stabia) and Antonino Castellano (chairman of Sorrento). Spadavecchia appealed twice, but dismissed by the Corte di Giustizia Federale of FIGC and the Tribunale Nazionale di Arbitrato per lo Sport of CONI.

Return to football
In mid-2015 he was signed by amateur side Atletico Mola. He played at least one game for the team in Eccellenza Apulia league, against Mesagne. In December 2015 he joined the local side of Altamura.

International career
Spadavecchia capped 17 times for Italy national under-20 football team, the ladder team between U19 and U21. Spadavecchia was part of the U20 squad in 2001 Mediterranean Games. The team won a silver medal. However, Spadavecchia was an unused bench for the whole tournament.

References

External links
 
 

1982 births
Living people
21st-century Italian criminals
Sportspeople involved in betting scandals
People from Molfetta
Italian footballers
Serie B players
Serie C players
S.S.C. Bari players
Delfino Pescara 1936 players
Catania S.S.D. players
Association football controversies
Association football goalkeepers
S.S. Fidelis Andria 1928 players
A.S. Sambenedettese players
Italy youth international footballers
Mediterranean Games silver medalists for Italy
Mediterranean Games medalists in football
Competitors at the 2001 Mediterranean Games
Footballers from Apulia
Sportspeople from the Metropolitan City of Bari